HMS Antigua has been the name of four ships of the Royal Navy, named after the Caribbean island of Antigua:

  was a 14-gun brig-sloop that had formerly served as a privateer. She was purchased in 1757 and sold in 1763.
  was a 14-gun sloop that entered service in 1779 and was sold in 1782.
  was a brig that entered service in 1780 and that the French captured in May 1781. She was under the command of Lieutenant John Hutt. 
  was the former French privateer Egyptienne. Captured in 1804, she served as a prison ship until scrapped in 1816.
  was a  laid down as the United States Navy  patrol frigate . She was launched in 1943, and delivered to the Royal Navy under Lend-Lease in 1944. She was returned to the United States Navy in 1946 and scrapped in 1947.

Citations

References
 Demerliac, Alain (1996) La Marine De Louis XVI: Nomenclature Des Navires Français De 1774 À 1792. (Nice: Éditions OMEGA). 
 Hepper, David J. (1994) British Warship Losses in the Age of Sail, 1650-1859. (Rotherfield: Jean Boudriot). 

Royal Navy ship names